The metal ion-catalyzed σ-bond rearrangement is a collection of chemical reactions that occur with highly strained organic compounds are treated with metal ions like Ag+, Rh(I), or Pd(II) based reagents.  [2+2] ring openings are sometimes observed:

These rearrangements proceed via oxidative addition of strained rings.  Such processes are related to the activation of cyclopropanes by transition metals.

See also 
 Cyclobutane
 Cubane
 Cuneane

References